Camden Friends Meetinghouse is a historic Quaker meeting house located on Delaware Route 10 (Camden Wyoming Avenue) in Camden, Kent County, Delaware. It was built in 1805, and was still in operation as a Quaker meeting house when it was listed on the National Register of Historic Places in 1973.  A modern  Camden Friends Meeting and Social Hall has been built behind the historic building, which now serves the meeting, and was designed to be energy-efficient and architecturally respectful of the historic building.

Camden was a center of Quaker population;  the town itself was laid out by Daniel Mifflin, a member of the Society of Friends, in 1783.  The Camden Monthly Meeting, or Camden Meeting, was established in 1830, as a merger of the 1828-founded Motherkill Monthly Meeting and the Duck Creek Meeting, and met alternately at this building and at a Little Creek Meetinghouse until 1865, after which it met just here.  In 1973, it was the only active Quaker meeting in southern Delaware, and was "under the jurisdiction of the Philadelphia Yearly Meeting."

The meetinghouse is a two-story, gambrel-roofed, brick building.  The roof is punctuated by two shed roofed dormers.  The second floor housed a school that operated from 1805 to 1882.

Numerous members participated in the Underground Railroad, including John Hunn who was a conductor and in fact "Chief Engineer" of Delaware operations.

The Meetinghouse's cemetery, which has notably tall gravestones, contains the remains of John Hunn and his son, Delaware Governor John Hunn.

The  new meetinghouse won the 2011 Northeast Sustainable Energy Association (NESEA)'a "Zero Net Energy Building Award, was one of the 2010 Real Estate and Construction Review's "Best New Green Projects in the Northeast Region", and won the "2010 Preservation Award of the Year" of the Friends of Old Dover.

References

External links

Historic American Buildings Survey in Delaware
Quaker meeting houses in Delaware
Churches on the National Register of Historic Places in Delaware
Churches in Kent County, Delaware
Religious buildings and structures completed in 1805
19th-century Quaker meeting houses
1805 establishments in Delaware
National Register of Historic Places in Kent County, Delaware